is a passenger railway station in the city of Sakuragawa, Ibaraki, Japan, operated by East Japan Railway Company (JR East).

Lines
Yamato Station is served by the Mito Line, and is located 25.9 km from the official starting point of the line at Oyama Station.

Station layout
The station consists of one side platform serving traffic in both directions. The station is unattended.

History
Yamato Station was opened on 20 June 1988.

Surrounding area

See also
 List of railway stations in Japan

External links

 JR East Station Information 

Railway stations in Ibaraki Prefecture
Mito Line
Railway stations in Japan opened in 1988
Sakuragawa, Ibaraki